The 2010–11 Curaçao League (Sekshon Pagá) is the 2010–11 season of the Curaçao League.

Regular season

Top Six Playoff

Top Four Playoff

Final

Match annulled and replayed due to Fortuna using an ineligible player as substitute and an incorrectly executed doping test; Fortuna 3 points deducted.

Replay:

External links
Curaçao 2010/11, RSSSF.com
Curaçao Sekshon Pagá 2010/2011, Soccerway.com

2010-11
1
Curaçao